André Blatter (born 29 June 1965) is an Austrian cross-country skier. He competed in the men's 15 kilometre classical event at the 1988 Winter Olympics.

References

1965 births
Living people
Austrian male cross-country skiers
Olympic cross-country skiers of Austria
Cross-country skiers at the 1988 Winter Olympics
Sportspeople from Bern